The  (VGN; Transport Association Region Nuremberg) is the transit authority of the city of Nuremberg, the second largest city of the German state of Bavaria. Its jurisdiction covers the city and its surrounding area, responsible for the Nuremberg S-Bahn commuter trains, the Nuremberg U-Bahn, the Nuremberg tramway and buses. While not co-extensive with the wider Nuremberg Metropolitan Region, it covers most of it with the exception of several smaller towns and rural areas on the periphery, as well as Sonneberg in the neighboring state of Thuringia.

The VGN coordinates transport and fares in area comprising the city of Nuremberg, Fürth, Erlangen, Schwabach, Bayreuth, Bamberg, Ansbach, Amberg and 17 surrounding districts. It is jointly owned by the state of Bavaria, by the city of Nuremberg, Fürth, Erlangen, Schwabach, Bayreuth, Bamberg, Ansbach, Amberg and the 17 surrounding districts, which are:

 Landkreis Ansbach
 Landkreis Amberg-Sulzbach
 Landkreis Bamberg
 Landkreis Bayreuth
 Landkreis Erlangen-Höchstadt
 Landkreis Forchheim
 Landkreis Fürth
 Landkreis Haßberge
 Landkreis Kitzingen
 Landkreis Lichtenfels
 Landkreis Neumarkt
 Landkreis Neustadt an der Aisch-Bad Windsheim
 Landkreis Nürnberger Land
 Landkreis Roth
 Landkreis Weißenburg-Gunzenhausen

There are some districts, which are also in some regions part of the VGN, they are:

 Landkreis Donau-Ries
 Landkreis Eichstätt
 Landkreis Kelheim
 Landkreis Neustadt an der Waldnaab
 Landkreis Regensburg
 Landkreis Schwäbisch Hall

Transport services are provided by over 10 companies. These include the Deutsche Bahn that also operates the S-Bahn, the Verkehrs-Aktiengesellschaft Nürnberg (VAG) that operates the U-Bahn, tramway and city buses, together with multiple operators of regional trains and buses.

References

External links
Official site

Transport in Nuremberg
Nürnberg Verkehrsverbund Großraum
1986 establishments in West Germany
Companies based in Nuremberg
Companies based in Bavaria
Transport companies established in 1986